is a railway station on the Kansai Main Line (Yamatoji Line) in Naniwa-ku, Osaka, Japan.

Lines
West Japan Railway Company
Kansai Main Line (Yamatoji Line)
Osaka Loop Line

Layout

2 platforms on the second level serve 3 tracks (Yamatoji Line tracks and Osaka Loop Line outer clockwise track), and a side platform on the third level a track (Osaka Loop Line inner counter-clockwise track).

2nd level

3rd level

History 
Station numbering was introduced in March 2018 with Imamiya being assigned station number JR-Q18 for the Yamatoji Line and JR-O18 for the Osaka Loop Line.

Adjacent stations

|-
!colspan=5|West Japan Railway Company (JR West)

References 

Osaka Loop Line
Railway stations in Osaka Prefecture
Railway stations in Japan opened in 1899